100F may refer to:

 Fujichrome Provia 100F (RDP III), a professional color reversal film by Fujifilm
 Fujichrome Velvia 100F (RVP 100F), a highly color-saturated professional color reversal film by Fujifilm